Tipularia is a genus of temperate terrestrial orchids (family Orchidaceae). At present (June 2014), it has 7 recognized species, native to Asia and North America.

Tipularia cunninghamii (King & Prain) S.C.Chen, S.W.Gale & P.J.Cribb - Uttarakhand, Sikkim, Taiwan
Tipularia discolor (Pursh) Nutt. - from Texas and Florida north to Michigan and Massachusetts
Tipularia harae (Maek.) S.C.Chen - Kyushu
Tipularia japonica Matsum. - Japan, Korea
Tipularia josephi Rchb.f. ex Lindl. - Tibet, Nepal, Bhutan, Assam, Myanmar 
Tipularia odorata Fukuy. - Taiwan
Tipularia szechuanica Schltr. - Gansu, Shaanxi, Sichuan, Yunnan

References

 
Calypsoinae genera